The 1981 edition of the Campeonato Carioca kicked off on May 23, 1981 and ended on December 6, 1981. It is the official tournament organized by FFERJ (Federação de Futebol do Estado do Rio de Janeiro, or Rio de Janeiro State Football Federation. Only clubs based in the Rio de Janeiro State are allowed to play. Twelve teams contested this edition. Flamengo won the title for the 21st time. Serrano and Olaria were relegated.

System
The tournament would be divided in four stages:
 Taça Guanabara: The twelve teams all played in a single round-robin format against each other. The champions qualified to the Final phase. 
 Taça Ney Cidade Pinheiro: The twelve teams all played in a single round-robin format against each other. The champions qualified to the Final phase.
 Taça Sylvio Corrêa Pacheco: The twelve teams all played in a single round-robin format against each other. The champions qualified to the Final phase.
 Final phase: The champions of the two stages, plus the team with the best overall record would play that phase. In case one team won two rounds, an up-to-three match series against the other stage winner would be played: a tie favoured the team with the most stages won; in case of a loss, another match would be held under the same rules; if another loss occurred, another match would be held, and in case of another loss, the title would go to the team that had won only one stage.

Championship

Taça Alfredo Curvelo
This tournament was played in late 1980, by the four teams that had been eliminated in the first round of the 1980 championship, and those that had been eliminated in the preliminary tournament of that year, to define the two teams that would play in the championship of 1981.

Taça Guanabara

Taça Ney Cidade Palmeiro

Taça Sylvio Corrêa Pacheco

Aggregate table

Finals

References

Campeonato Carioca seasons
Carioca